Renato Cornett (born 12 June 1965) is an Australian boxer. He competed in the men's lightweight event at the 1984 Summer Olympics.

References

1965 births
Living people
Australian male boxers
Olympic boxers of Australia
Boxers at the 1984 Summer Olympics
Sportspeople from Varaždin
Lightweight boxers